Located in the Historic Core of Downtown Los Angeles, the Old Bank District is a group of early 20th century commercial buildings, many of which have been (or are being) converted into residential (loft) use.  The Old Bank District is bordered roughly by the Jewelry District, the Fashion District, Gallery Row, the Toy District, and the city's Civic Center - specifically the block from Main to Spring streets between 4th and 5th.

Though the name suggests a subdistrict of the city, it is actually the name of the residential conversion project proposed by developer Tom Gilmore in 1998. Spurred on by the city's 1999 passage of an adaptive reuse ordinance, the first structure opened in fall 2000. Since that time, Gilmore has generally applied the Old Bank District label to his growing portfolio of upscale eateries and retail space tenants. On January 8, 2004, the Old Bank District became an official city-designated district. The borders are 3rd Street at the northern border, 6th Street at the southern border, Los Angeles Street on the Eastern border, and Spring Street on the western border.

The Old Bank District overlaps with the Spring Street Financial District.

Properties

Properties owned by Old Bank District / Gilmore Associates:
 The Continental Building
 The Hellman Building
 The San Fernando Building
 Farmers and Merchants Bank Building

Adjacent properties:
 The El Dorado Lofts
 The Rowan Building
 Rosslyn Lofts

In popular culture

 Downtown with Huell Howser

See also

 Central Business District, Los Angeles (1880-1899)
 Hotel Rosslyn Annex

References

External links
Old Bank District
Historic Core - Live Here

Districts of Downtown Los Angeles
Populated places established in 1998